NGC 197 is a lenticular galaxy located in the constellation Cetus. It was discovered on October 16, 1863 by Albert Marth.

See also 
 List of NGC objects (1–1000)

References

External links 
 
 
 SEDS

0197
0406
+00-02-110
2365
Lenticular galaxies
Astronomical objects discovered in 1863
Cetus (constellation)